XCX may refer to:

Citibank, United States (ICAO Code)
Charli XCX, English singer-songwriter
Xenoblade Chronicles X, a 2015 Wii U video game